The Dynacord ADD-One (Advanced Digital Drums) is a German-manufactured, American-designed  drum machine that was first released in 1986. It uses recorded samples to produce its sounds through analog voltage controlled envelopes and analog filters with resonance, to self-oscillation per voice. It comes with 1Mbyte of memory and can be upgraded up to 8Mbytes.

Sample Rate and Bit Rate
The unit can sample up to 50 kHz at 12-bits  for up to 20 seconds.  Actually it is 8 bits with 4 bits of companding according to one of the designers Michael Doidic.  The sample rate and therefore the pitch is variable, like the Fairlight and E-mu EII and other earlier samples, via the 8 separate DACs - variable pitch via sample clock rate change.  Later digital samplers, including those that operate in software utilise interpolation and other techniques to alter the pitch of a sample - the effect, particularly in the low-end is not the same.

Display
The unit features an 80-character backlit LCD.

Sounds
Bass drums, congas, snares, Hihats as well as single-cycle waveforms (sine/triangle etc.) contained on EPROMS.  With the optional 'Add-One Drive' one can sample any recorded sounds into the sampler via the microphone/line input with on-board compressor.

External Control
The Chain mode  allows these to be called up in any order and stepped through by a footswitch. The unit also features MIDI which allows it to be controlled from an external device such as a synthesizer or electronic drums.

Notable users
Jean-Michel Jarre

References

Further reading

Drum machines
MIDI
Japanese musical instruments
Music technology